Cyclone Xavier is a European windstorm which crossed northern Europe in early October 2017. Germany was the worst affected country, with high winds between 4 and 6 October causing severe damage, including in and around Berlin.

Development
Coming from the North Atlantic Ocean, the depression travelled  within 24 hours. During the night of 4 October, Xavier moved across Great Britain towards the North Sea arriving at the border region between Denmark and Germany on 5 October late in the morning. Later on 5 October, the most powerful areas of the storm developed at the south-western flank of the depression's center. At noon, the storm had reached the northern German states of Lower Saxony and Schleswig-Holstein and swept across Saxony-Anhalt and the southern parts of Mecklenburg-Vorpommern in the afternoon. In the evening of 5 October, Xavier arrived in Brandenburg, Berlin, Thuringia and Saxony.

Storm Xavier reached hurricane strength at many locations. On the Brocken mountain in Germany, the wind speed reached  while  was recorded on Spiekeroog island in the North Sea.

Forecast and preparations

Forecast
In a preliminary notice on 4 October, the German Weather Service had announced a potential for storms with hurricane-like gusts and hurricane gusts on the next day from 10 a.m. through 6 p.m. in the North and from 2 through 10 p.m. in the East of Germany. This announcement was turned into a storm warning in the evening of 4 October.

Preparations
The population in Germany was warned through the 'NINA' smartphone app published by the Federal Office of Civil Protection and Disaster Assistance. The Berlin fire brigade declared a state of emergency on 5 October while on the same day, the Hamburg fire brigade urged people not to stay outside during the storm.

Impact

Germany

In Berlin, Hamburg, Brandenburg und Mecklenburg-Vorpommern, seven people died due to the storm. In Berlin, journalist and author Sylke Tempel was killed by a falling tree, four persons died under similar circumstances in Brandenburg and one fatality occurred in Hamburg. In the harbour town of Wilhelmshaven, the storm toppled a gantry crane that weighed c. .

Numerous railway lines in Germany became impassable forcing rail traffic to be shut down.

Poland
At least two people were killed and 39 sustained injuries. A man died in Lubusz Voivodeship by falling from a roof and in Greater Poland Voivodeship, a woman was killed by a falling branch. The storm primarily struck the South and West of the country. According to the Polish government's security centre, some 800,000 people were temporarily without electric power. 40,000 relief personnel were called to 10,000 situations across Poland.

Czech Republic
In the Czech Republic, the fire services had to tend to several hundred calls. A regional train hit a tree on the tracks near Bělá (Semily District) and some railway lines had to be closed completely.

References

External links

German Weather Service report on storm Xavier (In German).

European windstorms
Cyclone Xavier